Kolah Chub (also Romanized as Kolah Chūb; also known as Gol Jūb, Kolah Jūb, Kolāh Jūb, Kolājūb, and Koleh Jūb) is a village in Zalian Rural District, Zalian District, Shazand County, Markazi Province, Iran. At the 2006 census, its population was 92, in 24 families.

References 

Populated places in Shazand County